Poldi or Poldy may refer to:


People

Nickname
 Prince Leopold of Bavaria (born 1943), Bavarian prince and former race car driver
 Leopold Bentley, born Leopold Bloch-Bauer, a co-founder of what became Canfor, a Canadian integrated forest products company
 Leopoldine Maria Josefa Kalmus, mother of philosopher Ludwig Wittgenstein
 Leopold Kielholz (1911–1980), Swiss footballer
 Leopoldine Kovarik (1919–1943), German anti-Nazi activist
 Lukas Podolski (born 1985), Polish-German footballer
 Leopold Schädler (1926–1992), Liechtenstein alpine skier

Other
 Poldy Bird (1941–2018), Argentinian writer and poet
 Poldi Hirsch (1926–1987), German-born American architect
 Poldi Dur, Austrian dancer and stage actress born Elisabeth Handl (1917–1996)

Other uses
 Poldy, nickname of Leopold Bloom, protagonist of James Joyce's 1922 novel Ulysses
 Poldi Kladno, previous name of SK Kladno, a football club from Kladno, Czech Republic

See also
 Poldek

Lists of people by nickname
Hypocorisms